Bring It may refer to:

 "Snakes on a Plane (Bring It)", the song by Cobra Starship from the soundtrack album Snakes on a Plane: The Album
 "Bring It" (song), a 2011 single by English singer-songwriter Jodie Connor
 Bring It!, a 2009 album by Puffy
 Bring It! (TV series)